Berruyer is a surname. Notable people with the surname include:

 Guy Berruyer (born 1951), French businessman
 Isaac-Joseph Berruyer (1681–1758), French Jesuit historian
 Jean-François Berruyer (1741–1804), French general 
 Philip Berruyer (died 1260), French archbishop